The Černová massacre (or Černová tragedy,  or Csernova Affair) was a shooting that took place in Csernova, Kingdom of Hungary (today Černová, part of Ružomberok, Slovakia) on 27 October 1907 in which 15 people were killed and many were wounded after gendarmes fired into a crowd of people gathering for the consecration of the local Catholic church. The shootings sparked protests in European and American press and turned the world's attention to the treatment of minorities in the Hungarian part of Austria-Hungary.

Outline of the events

Pretext
On the initiative of Andrej Hlinka, the Slovak parish priest of nearby Ružomberok (Rózsahegy) and a native of Černová, people of the city decided to raise money for the construction of a new church. The locals raised 80,000 crowns, and the collections received minor donations from Slovak Americans as well. The construction started in April 1907 and by the autumn, the church was ready for consecration.

The locals wanted the church to be consecrated by Hlinka, however, he was at the time  suspended by bishop Sándor Párvy and sentenced to two years of imprisonment due to his pro-Slovak agitation during the election campaign of 1906 and the subsequent conviction of incitement. The people of Černová thus demanded the consecration to be postponed until Hlinka would be able to perform the ceremony. The bishopric denied their request and two Hungarian-speaking priests were appointed in his stead: first, Canon Anton Kurimsky, and after his refusal, Dean Martin Pazurik of Likavka.

The ceremony was to take place on 27 October 1907. The official procession arrived at the village accompanied by a squad of 15 gendarmes. It was protested against by the locals, who attempted to block its way to the church to prevent Pazurik from consecrating. The demonstration was peaceful in nature  although some accounts report stone-throwing at a member of the gendarme escort. In panic the gendarme leader sergeant Ján Ladiczky, an ethnic Slovak, ordered his squad to open fire into the crowd without prior warning killing 15 of the protesting villagers, seriously wounding 12 and lightly injuring 40.

The majority of the members of the Hungarian gendarmes involved in the shooting were of Slovak origin (five persons from the total seven), and they performed the shootings not because of any ethnic reason, but they were obligated to do so according to the rules of their service.

Consequences
Hlinka's appeal against his 1906 verdict was rejected, thus, on 30 November 1907 Hlinka started to serve his jail term in the Csillagbörtön (Star Prison), Szeged. On the other hand, Hlinka appealed with success his suspension to the Holy See, so it was cancelled on 8 April 1909. When Hlinka left the prison, Bishop Párvy appointed him again to his Ružomberok parish, and Hlinka consecrated the church in Černová with Párvy's consent. The tragedy sparked protests in the European and US press and it turned the world's attention to the attitude to the minorities in Hungary.

Today's Slovak politicians — especially the members of the Slovak National Party interpret the event as "Hungarian gendarmes shooting at innocent Slovaks". With many of their claims regarding the events, the Slovak National Party continues to perpetuate a "false myth of Černová". Some Slovak sources claim that the gendarmes were ethnic Hungarian. even though there was a very small number of ethnic Hungarians in the region where the gendarmes were recruited. According to Slovak historian Roman Holec, professor at Comenius University in Bratislava, the majority of the gendarmes were Slovaks from Liptó county. (According to the official 1910 census, over 90% of the population were ethnic Slovaks in that county.) They were nevertheless honored for the deed, because they were in the service of Hungarian state. The rioters were violent from lack of fear of getting shot (i.e. that the sergeant would refrain from giving an order of fire or use blanks). The gendarmes were shooting in all directions instead of aiming for feet or into the air (most victims died due to their head and chest injuries).

See also
List of massacres in Slovakia
Magyarization

References

External links
Anniversary overshadowed by Černová tragedy

Mass murder in 1907
1907 in Austria-Hungary
Massacres in 1907
October 1907 events
Mass shootings in Slovakia
History of Austria-Hungary
Ružomberok